Chen Lili is a Chinese singer.

Biography
At the age of 8, Chen studied music under Li Li at Xiaodujuan Art Troupe. She was educated in Hubei Art Vocational College from 1996 to 1999, her teacher was Xiao Shuyun and Yu Hui. From 1999 to 2004, she was educated in China Conservatory of Music, her teacher was Jin Tielin.

In 2004, Chen worked in Beijing Song and Dance Troupe, she joined the Chinese People's Liberation Army Naval Song and Dance Troupe in 2007.

Discography
 Ode To Red Flag
 Bless You
 Chinese Seal

References

China Conservatory of Music alumni
Living people
Musicians from Changsha
Chinese women singers
Singers from Hunan
Year of birth missing (living people)